Carlos Ruiz (born May 9, 1997) is a Spanish professional wrestler known under his ringname A-Kid. He is currently signed to WWE, where he performs on NXT as Axiom. He has also performed in NXT UK, where he was the inaugural NXT UK Heritage Cup Champion. He has previously competed on the American and European independent circuits, notably for Pro Wrestling Guerrilla (PWG), Progress Wrestling, Chikara, Defiant Wrestling and White Wolf Wrestling (Triple W). Ruiz is the first Spanish-born wrestler to ever sign with the WWE. In 2018, Ruiz became the first Spaniard and, at the age of 20, the youngest wrestler to ever compete in a singles match rated 5 stars by Dave Meltzer of the Wrestling Observer Newsletter.

Professional wrestling career

International promotions (2012–2019)
In June 2016, it was announced A-Kid would participate with Rod Zayas and Adam Chase in Chikara's King of Trios, as House White Wolf. However, they would be defeated by House British Strong Style (Pete Dunne, Trent Seven and Tyler Bate) in the first round. Next year, he participated in the Chikaras Rey de Voladores tournament, but was defeated in the finals by Air Wolf. The following years, A-Kid and Adam Chase (later, Carlos Romo) wrestled in the British circuit as Team White Wolf, winning the Attack! Tag Team Championships. They also faced each other in RevPro 7th Anniversary Show.

WWE (2019–present)
A-Kid made his WWE debut alongside fellow wrestler Carlos Romo on April 20, 2019, where they were defeated by Gallus (Mark Coffey and Wolfgang) during a set of NXT UK tapings. On October 17, 2019, A-Kid was announced as having signed for the NXT UK brand. He made his singles debut on October 31, 2019, defeating Kassius Ohno. On November 26, 2020, A-Kid became the first ever NXT UK Heritage Cup Champion by defeating Trent Seven at the finals. On the May 20, 2021 edition of NXT UK, A-Kid dropped the NXT UK Heritage Cup to Tyler Bate. On the October 14 episode of NXT UK, A-Kid faced Ilja Dragunov for the NXT UK Championship but was defeated. In July 2022, Ruiz was repackaged as a superhero masked wrestler named Axiom.

Other media 
A-Kid made his video game debut on WWE 2K22 as a DLC alongside The Hurricane, Wes Lee, and Stacy Keibler known as the Stand Back Pack.

Championship and accomplishments 
 ATTACK! Pro Wrestling 
 ATTACK! Tag Team Championship (1 time) - with Adam Chase
Pro Wrestling Illustrated
 Ranked him No. 118 of the top 500 singles wrestlers in the PWI 500 in 2021
Westside Xtreme Wrestling
Ambition: Wildcard Edition (2019)
White Wolf Wrestling
 Triple W Absolute Championship (3 times)
 Triple W Extreme Championship (1 time)
 Triple W Heavyweight Championship (1 time)
WWE
 NXT UK Heritage Cup (1 time, inaugural)
NXT UK Heritage Cup Inaugural Tournament 2020

References

External links
 
 
 
 

1997 births
Living people
Sportspeople from Madrid
Spanish male professional wrestlers
21st-century professional wrestlers